Lauren Opal Boebert (born December 19, 1986) is an American politician, businesswoman, and gun rights activist serving as the U.S. representative for . From 2013 to 2022, she owned Shooters Grill, a restaurant in Rifle, Colorado, where staff members were encouraged to carry firearms openly.

A member of the Republican Party, Boebert is known for her gun rights advocacy, in particular after a confrontation with Beto O'Rourke over policy on semi-automatic rifles. In 2020, Boebert unexpectedly defeated incumbent representative Scott Tipton in the primary election, after which she beat the Democratic nominee, former state representative Diane Mitsch Bush, in the general election. In Congress, Boebert has associated herself with the conservative Republican Study Committee, the right-wing Freedom Caucus, of which she became the communications chair in January 2022, and the pro-gun Second Amendment Caucus. She won reelection in 2022 by a very narrow margin of 546 votes against former Aspen City Council member Adam Frisch.

Boebert is often described as a far-right ally of former President Donald Trump, although she rejects this label. She supports Trump's claims that the 2020 election was stolen from him and voted to overturn its results during the Electoral College vote count. She is accused of supporting the QAnon conspiracy theory, and some academic and journalistic sources have investigated her ties to far-right extremism. She opposes transitioning to green energy, COVID-19 mask and vaccine mandates, abortion, sex education, gender affirmation surgery for minors, and non-heterosexual marriage. She advocates for an isolationist foreign policy, but supports closer ties with Israel for religious reasons. A self-described born-again Christian, Boebert has said that she is "tired of this separation of church and state junk" and argued for greater church power and influence in government decision-making.

Early life and education 
Boebert was born in Altamonte Springs, Florida, on December 19, 1986. When she was 12, she and her family moved to the Montbello neighborhood of Denver and later to Aurora, Colorado, before settling in Rifle, Colorado, in 2003.

Boebert has said that her family depended on welfare when she was growing up. She dropped out of high school during her senior year in 2004 when she had a baby. She earned a GED certificate in 2020, a month before her first election primary.

Boebert has said that she was raised in a Democratic household in a liberal area. Records at the Colorado secretary of state's office show that her mother was registered to vote in Colorado as a Republican from 2001 to 2013 and as a Democrat from 2015 to 2020. Boebert herself registered to vote in 2006, at age 19, as a Democrat; in 2008, she changed her affiliation to Republican.

Early career 
After leaving high school, Boebert took a job as an assistant manager at a McDonald's in Rifle. After marrying in 2007, she got a job filing for a natural gas drilling company and then became a pipeliner, a member of a team that builds and maintains pipelines and pumping stations.

Restaurant ownership

In 2013, Boebert and her husband opened Shooters Grill in Rifle, west of Glenwood Springs, Colorado. Boebert says she obtained a concealed carry permit after a man was "beaten to death by another man's hands ... outside of [her] restaurant", and began encouraging the restaurant's servers to carry guns openly. Her statement about the man is mostly false: In 2013, a man who had reportedly engaged in a fight blocks away ran to within about a block of Boebert's restaurant, fell, and died from a methamphetamine overdose. The Boeberts also owned a restaurant called Smokehouse 1776 (now defunct), across the street from Shooters Grill. In 2015, Boebert opened Putters restaurant on Rifle Creek Golf Course, which she sold in December 2016. Shooters Grill, according to her congressional disclosure forms, lost $143,000 in 2019 and due to pandemic closure mandates, lost $226,000 in 2020.

In 2017, 80 people who attended a Garfield County fair contracted food poisoning after eating pork sliders from a temporary location set up by Shooters Grill and Smokehouse 1776. The restaurants did not have the required permits to operate the temporary location, and the Garfield County health department determined that the outbreak was caused by unsafe food handling at the event.

In early 2020 Boebert protested stay-at-home orders issued by Colorado Governor Jared Polis, which included closing restaurants to indoor dining in response to the COVID-19 pandemic. In mid-May 2020, during the pandemic, she violated the state's stay-at-home order by reopening Shooters Grill for dine-in service, for which she received a cease and desist order from Garfield County, with which she refused to comply. The next day, Boebert moved tables outside, onto the sidewalk, and in parking spaces. The following day, Garfield County suspended her food license. By late May, with the state allowing restaurants to reopen at 50% capacity, the county dropped its temporary restraining order.

Shooters Grill closed in July 2022, when the building's new owner opted not to renew the lease.

U.S House of Representatives

Elections

2020

Primary 

In September 2019, Boebert made national headlines when she confronted Beto O'Rourke, a candidate in the 2020 Democratic presidential primary, at an Aurora town hall meeting over his proposal for a buy-back program and a ban on assault-style rifles like AR-15s. Later that month, she opposed a measure banning guns in city-owned buildings at a meeting of the Aspen City Council. The ordinance passed unanimously a month later.

Boebert was an organizer of the December 2019 "We Will Not Comply!" rally opposing Colorado's red flag law, which allows guns to be taken from people deemed a threat. The American Patriots Three Percent militia, affiliated with the Three Percenters, provided security, and members of the Proud Boys attended the rally. On Twitter, Boebert has used rhetoric friendly to the Three Percenters and posed with members of the group (she deleted the tweet with the photos after being asked about it). During her congressional campaign, she said she was "with the militia".

In December 2019, Boebert launched her bid to represent  in the United States House of Representatives, beginning with a challenge to five-term incumbent Scott Tipton in the Republican primary. During her campaign, she criticized Alexandria Ocasio-Cortez and other members of "The Squad", positioning herself as a conservative alternative to the progressive representative. Seth Masket, a political science professor at the University of Denver, suggested that Boebert wanted to motivate Republican voters to participate in the primary during a slow election cycle by stirring up their anger at Ocasio-Cortez and others.

Boebert criticized Tipton's voting record, which she said did not reflect his district. Before the primary, Trump endorsed Tipton, but Boebert characterized him as unsupportive of Trump. She accused the incumbent of supporting amnesty for undocumented immigrants by voting for H.R. 5038, the Farm Workforce Modernization Act of 2019, saying that the act had a provision that led to citizenship and provided funding for housing for undocumented farm workers. Boebert decried what she said was Tipton's insufficient efforts to continue funding for the Paycheck Protection Program, whose money had run out within two weeks, arguing that more was needed. Boebert raised just over $150,000 through the June 30 primary.

In a May 2020 interview on SteelTruth, a QAnon-supporting web show, Boebert said she was "very familiar with" the conspiracy theory: "Everything I've heard of Q, I hope that this is real because it only means America is getting stronger and better." The Colorado Times Recorder reported that she followed multiple YouTube channels connected with QAnon before deleting her YouTube account when it came under scrutiny. But after winning the Republican primary, Boebert denied following QAnon and endorsing conspiracy theories, instead saying she wanted to uphold "freedom and the Constitution of the United States of America".

In September 2019, Boebert aide and future campaign manager Sherrona Bishop published a video on her Facebook page in which she interviewed a self-proclaimed member of the far-right group Proud Boys, which Bishop called "pro-everything that makes America great", adding, "thank God for you guys and the Proud Boys". Bishop left the Boebert campaign shortly after Boebert won the Republican nomination. In October 2020, Boebert's campaign denied any connection to the Proud Boys and said Boebert did not share Bishop's views.

On June 30, Boebert won the Republican nomination with 54.6% of the vote to Tipton's 45.4%. The result gained national attention and surprised political commentators. CNN and Politico called it a "stunning upset"; The Hill made a similar statement. Tipton conceded defeat on election night and Trump congratulated Boebert in a tweet. Democratic Congressional Campaign Committee chair Cheri Bustos said in a statement that national Republicans should disavow Boebert for supporting QAnon.

Boebert was the first primary challenger to defeat a sitting U.S. representative in Colorado in 48 years, since Democratic Representative Wayne Aspinall lost to Alan Merson. She pledged to join the Freedom Caucus upon taking office.

General election 
Boebert faced Democratic former state representative Diane Mitsch Bush, a retired sociology professor from Steamboat Springs, Colorado, in the November general election. Boebert said that Mitsch Bush's platform was "more government control" and that Mitsch Bush had a "socialist agenda". Boebert emphasized her devotion to Trump and his policies and reiterated her points about deregulation of industries and decreasing healthcare funding, while rallying for the expansion of gun rights.

In late July, Boebert was considered the front-runner. A September survey paid for by Michael Bloomberg's Democratic-leaning House Majority PAC had Mitsch Bush ahead by one percentage point. Mitsch Bush outraised Boebert, with $4.2 million for her and nearly $4 million spent by Democratic operatives, as opposed to Boebert's $2.4 million raised and more than $5 million spent by the Republicans, but Boebert won the election, 51.27% to 45.41%. According to the Atlas of the 2020 Elections, Boebert was able to command strong support in the traditionally conservative areas of the Western Slope of Colorado and the San Luis Valley while retaining enough Republican votes in liberal-leaning Pueblo and other Democratic areas. It also argued that Boebert had performed relatively worse than other Republican colleagues that managed to get elected in the state, as compared to the support of Trump at the polls, with the 3rd district witnessing few split-ticket votes. However, her campaign succeeded in appealing to independence and rebellion, thus getting the necessary votes.

Boebert reimbursed herself $22,259 for mileage costs in 2020 from her campaign's finances, which legally would require her to have driven . The Denver Post reported in early February 2021 that three ethics experts said that the high figure was suspicious. Boebert's campaign attributed the figure to her "aggressive travel schedule", but members of her campaign did not provide evidence for the amount of travel. CPR News calculated that it was plausible that Boebert had driven 30,000 miles based on her visits to 129 events. Boebert said in a mid-February interview that she "drove tens of thousands of miles ... I had to make those connections, and really, I underreported a lot of stuff." In late February 2021, Boebert's campaign updated its campaign finance filing, reclassifying $3,053 claimed for mileage to "hotels", and $867 claimed for mileage to Uber rides, thus claiming a mileage of around 30,000 miles.

Despite campaign finance laws and ethics laws requiring Congressional candidates to reveal their immediate family's income sources to show potential conflicts of interest, Boebert did not report her husband's income in her 2020 filing, instead belatedly revealing it in August 2021, the same day the Federal Election Commission (FEC) sent her a letter investigating her campaign expenses. The filing, while misnaming the company involved, stated that her husband Jayson was paid $460,000 in 2019 and $478,000 in 2020 as a consultant for Terra Energy, one of Colorado's largest natural gas producers and fourth nationwide in methane emissions. The company told The Daily Beast that Jayson was a contracted shift worker for the company who was not paid directly but through another company, Boebert Consulting. As of 2021, Colorado classified Boebert Consulting as a delinquent company due to the lack of filings or registered agent with the state. Boebert oversees the energy industry via her position on the House Committee on Natural Resources.

2022

Use of campaign funds for personal expenses 
In August 2021, the FEC investigated the apparent use of more than $6,000 from Boebert's 2022 reelection campaign funds for her personal expenses. The funds were used between May and June 2021 via four Venmo payments. Boebert's communications director said that these were indeed personal expenses, "billed to the campaign account in error", and that the "reimbursement has already happened". In September 2021, Boebert submitted documents to the FEC declaring that the campaign money had been used to settle rental and utilities bills, and had since been reimbursed.

Republican primary 
Boebert sought a second term representing Colorado's 3rd congressional district in the 2022 election. During the primary, her main challenger was Don Coram, a state senator who positioned himself as more moderate. Boebert aimed to portray him as corrupt, in particular by alleging that he used his powers as a state legislator to pass laws legalizing hemp, which Coram grows (state voters approved the amendment legalizing marijuana in 2012), and tried to depict him as not Republican enough. A Democratic-aligned Super PAC made false claims and unproven allegations about Boebert. Boebert's attorney said in June that she would file a defamation lawsuit against the group, but she has not done so. The temporary restraining order she obtained on June 23 against David Wheeler, one of its co-founders, was vacated in July and the case dismissed.

Boebert's campaign had a significant advantage, with $5 million in campaign funds to Coram's $225,000; Coram also started campaigning late in the primary, and Boebert was endorsed by Donald Trump. During the pre-primary debate on May 26, Boebert emphasized the bills she had introduced in Congress while questioning Coram's legislative votes. She also repeated claims of massive election fraud and invoked her opposition to the restrictions introduced as a result of the spread of what she called the "Fauci-funded China virus" (SARS-CoV-2).

Boebert supporters failed to throw Coram off the ballot for allegedly not having collected enough signatures. Several thousand Democrats tried to influence the election by renouncing their membership in the party and voting as independents for more moderate Republicans, which is allowed in the state. Boebert won the primary with almost 66% of the vote.

General election 
In a debate with Democratic nominee Adam Frisch on September 11, 2022, Boebert took credit for bills she had voted against, did not cross-examine Frisch, proposed more oil and gas development to respond to climate change, and kept attacking House speaker Nancy Pelosi. Boebert defeated Frisch by a small margin in a closer than expected race. The margin was so close it triggered an automatic recount. The recount was completed on December 12 and affirmed that Boebert won by about 500 votes.

Tenure 
As of January 29, 2022, she had introduced 17 bills and seven resolutions, none of which passed committee.

Observers describe Boebert as far-right; she rejects the label.

Boebert has blocked her critics on Twitter. She was sued for blocking a constituent, Bri Buentello. A U.S. District court denied Buentello a preliminary injunction on June 24, 2021, finding a difference between her official government Twitter account and her personal account. The case was dismissed with prejudice on October 28, 2022.

In September 2021, Boebert submitted a resolution to impeach President Joe Biden and another to impeach Vice President Kamala Harris over the withdrawal of United States troops from Afghanistan.

On January 3, 2023, at the beginning of the 118th Congress, Boebert voted for Jim Jordan to be the U.S. House Speaker, in rebuke of House Minority Leader Kevin McCarthy.

In February 2023, Boebert and Representatives Andrew Clyde, Barry Moore, and George Santos sponsored a bill to name the AR-15 the U.S. "national gun".

Committee assignments 
Boebert has the following committee assignments:

 Committee on Natural Resources
 Subcommittee on Indigenous Peoples of the United States 
 Subcommittee on Water, Ocean, and Wildlife.
 Committee on Budget

Caucus memberships 
Boebert is a member of the following Congressional caucuses:
 Freedom Caucus
 Republican Study Committee
 Second Amendment Caucus

Political positions

Certification of 2020 presidential election and Capitol attack 
On January 5, the day before the storming of the United States Capitol, Boebert urged people to "remember these next 48 hours", saying they would be among the most important in American history. The next day, in the hours before the Capitol was attacked, she described the day's events as Republicans' "1776 moment", a reference to the American Revolutionary War. Boebert then told Speaker Nancy Pelosi that her constituents were outside the Capitol and that she had promised to represent their voices in the chamber. During a town hall in March, Boebert appeared to defend the January 6 attackers on the Capitol, saying, "We already see in Washington, D.C. You can't petition your government. You're an insurrectionist if you do that!", later claiming that the remarks were made "in reference to the ongoing security measures in place around the Capitol complex".

During the counting of the Electoral College votes before the attack, Boebert objected to accepting Arizona's votes in a speech to the joint session of Congress. She accused Arizona of "unlawfully amending its voter registration laws by extending the registration periods", alleging widespread voter fraud, which echoed the false claims aired by Donald Trump, and accusing everyone who intended to accept the "results of this concentrated, coordinated, partisan effort by Democrats" of having allied themselves with the extremist left. In December 2021, Boebert doubled down on these allegations, saying that hundreds of thousands of ballots were illegally mailed to voters, without providing evidence. When the vote count resumed after the rioters had been removed from the Capitol, the challenges to Arizona's and Pennsylvania's electoral votes proceeded to a vote while those against several other states were dropped. Boebert voted against the certification of both states' electoral votes.

Democratic politicians in Colorado accused Boebert and her colleague Doug Lamborn of "helping incite violence" during the storming of the Capitol. While the Capitol was being stormed, Boebert posted information on Twitter about the proceedings of the certification, including that the House chamber had been locked down and that Pelosi had been evacuated. She was accused of endangering members' safety and faced calls to resign, but refused, defending her actions because Pelosi's evacuation was also publicly broadcast live on TV; academic Zac Parker opined that it was still a potential security threat since C-SPAN did not focus on Pelosi, and had it not been for Boebert's tweet, the protesters might have not noticed it. Boebert's communications director resigned on January 16 in response to her behavior on January 6.

In June 2021, Boebert was one of 21 House Republicans to vote against a resolution to give the Congressional Gold Medal to police officers who defended the U.S. Capitol. She later explained that she objected to giving an award to Billy Evans, who was included in the resolution and who died during an unrelated Capitol attack in April that year. Boebert additionally rejects the term "insurrection" for the January 6 events and has called the House inquiry into the attack a "sham witch hunt". She has equated the behavior of some of the rioters that participated in the Black Lives Matter (BLM) protests following the murder of George Floyd to those who attacked the Capitol. She alleged in a letter to US Attorney General Merrick Garland that he was being too lenient toward those who were arrested during the 2020 BLM riots, as compared to the Capitol rioters. She also entered a resolution seeking to recognize antifa as a domestic terrorist organization and said BLM would "burn down cities and destroy businesses".

Boebert opposes the National Popular Vote Interstate Compact, which would elect the president by popular vote.

Education 
Boebert supports eliminating the U.S. Department of Education. She has named eliminating critical race theory from schools as one of her top legislative priorities, even though it is not taught in schools. During a press conference, she asserted that it was a lie, that it was racist, and that it would lead to children hating each other.

Firearms 
Boebert is a strong advocate for gun rights. During her primary campaign, she voiced opposition to Colorado's recently enacted red flag law. On January 1, 2021, in a letter co-signed by more than 80 Republicans, Boebert asked Speaker Pelosi and House Minority Leader Kevin McCarthy to uphold the 1967 law exempting members of Congress from a Capitol Hill ban on firearms, which allowed them to keep arms in their offices.

After saying that she planned to carry a gun while working on Capitol Hill, Boebert published a viral video advertisement showing her placing a handgun in a hip holster and walking through the neighborhood, near federal buildings and through alleys. Her spokesman later said that she had not been carrying a gun during the walk. The video was made by the same consulting firm that produced the viral August 2020 campaign video for House candidate Kimberly Klacik.

On January 5, Boebert refused a bag check after she set off the newly installed Capitol Hill metal detectors, and entered the Capitol. She did the same on January 6, refusing to stop for a wand check after she set off the metal detector. Boebert called the metal detectors "just another political stunt by Speaker Pelosi". A New York Times profile of Boebert characterized her actions as "a made-for-Twitter moment that delighted the far right." The article said that although she had only been in Congress for a few days, she had "already arranged several episodes that showcased her brand of far-right defiance as a conspiracy theorist" and that she "represents an incoming faction of the party for whom breaking the rules—and gaining notoriety for doing it—is exactly the point." Democrats, fearing the guns might do harm while in Congress chambers and partly in response to Boebert's conspicuous carry of a firearm, proposed legislation, which is being considered in Congress as of February 2022, to ban guns from Capitol grounds altogether.

In February 2023, after the Bureau of Alcohol, Tobacco, Firearms and Explosives mandated that gun owners register any firearms that use "stabilizing braces", Boebert said the mandate violated the separation of powers. She added: "Alcohol, tobacco and firearms. In western Colorado, we call that a fun weekend. But D.C. bureaucrats have used this agency to infringe on the rights of the American people."

Support for conspiracy theories 
Boebert has embraced the QAnon conspiracy theory. During a March 15, 2021, town hall in Montrose, Colorado, advertised only to local Republicans who were asked to not disclose it publicly, she was asked when Hillary Clinton and other former officials would be arrested, a recurring theme of QAnon. She responded that she knew someone involved with documents declassified by Trump during the closing days of his presidency, and that the documents would reveal corruption that would trigger resignations that would allow Republicans to retake the House and Senate before 2022, echoing a theory promoted by The Epoch Times. Boebert urged people to dismiss comments about the outlet's unreliability and said the information came from "very good sources".

Comments on representatives of other religions 
In September 2021, Boebert told attendees at a Republican fundraiser that she and an aide were joined by Democratic representative Ilhan Omar on a Capitol elevator and that Boebert then said to her aide, "it's the Jihad Squad ... She doesn't have a backpack, she wasn't dropping it and running so we're good". Also that month, Boebert called Omar "a full-time propagandist for Hamas" and an "honorary member of Hamas". During a November 18, 2021, speech on the House floor, Boebert called Omar "the Jihad Squad member from Minnesota". At a November 20 event, she repeated the elevator story, this time including a Capitol Police officer with "fret all over his face". Omar responded that the story was invented and that "Anti-Muslim bigotry isn’t funny and shouldn’t be normalized". Boebert later apologized "to anyone in the Muslim community I offended with my comment about Representative Omar". After Boebert and Omar spoke by phone, both said the call went badly, with Boebert saying that she would put "America first, never sympathizing with terrorists. Unfortunately, Ilhan can't say the same thing." The Denver Post apologized on Boebert's behalf for her remarks, saying that it was embarrassing that a Colorado representative engaged in such behavior.

Four months later, Boebert confronted a group of Orthodox Jews visiting the Capitol and asked them whether they were on a reconnaissance mission, which left them confused. She later said the remark was made in jest.

Economy 
During her 2020 campaign, Boebert pledged that she would not support any federal budget that resulted in additional debt and that she would support a balanced budget amendment to the U.S. Constitution. She opposes any tax increases. While expressing support for more defense expenditure, Boebert was one of 75 House Republicans to vote against the National Defense Authorization Act of 2022, saying the bill had a "woke agenda".

In May 2022, Boebert was one of nine House members who voted against two bills to alleviate the 2022 shortage of baby formula caused by bacterial contamination. One of the bills, the Access to Baby Formula Act, makes it easier for low-income families to continue buying formula with vouchers; the other allows the government to invoke the Defense Production Act to speed up production. Boebert said she voted against the bills because "the Biden administration and Democrats created the issue."

Environment 
Boebert has supported the energy industry. During her campaign, she said she supported "all-of-the-above energy, but the markets decide ... not the government." She declared support for uranium extraction and the generation of nuclear power, touting it as the "cleanest form of energy". In February 2021, Boebert proposed a bill to ban executive moratoriums on oil and gas leases and permits on some federal lands. She also proposed amendments to the Build Back Better Act that would abolish methane-emission payments by fracking companies and others that would increase royalties for oil and gas extraction on federal lands and abolish fines and financial requirements for cleaning abandoned drilling infrastructure. Conversely, Boebert opposes sustainable energy initiatives because she considers green energy unreliable and believes that decreasing the extraction of fossil fuels in her district will "regulate our communities into poverty". She opposes the Green New Deal, claiming it would cost $93 trillion to implement and would bankrupt the country. Boebert also opposes the participation of the United States in the Paris Agreement, calling it "job-killing", and introduced a bill the day after Biden's inauguration seeking to block re-entrance of the country to the agreement by forcing its ratification in the Senate by a two-thirds supermajority and prohibiting the use of federal funds for reaching the agreement's goals.

Boebert believes that attempts at decarbonization should be made via forest management. She has introduced a forest management bill, the Active Forest Management, Wildfire Prevention and Community Protection Act, which would attempt to prevent wildfires through several mitigation measures, such as removing trees killed by bark beetles, making it harder for groups to go to court to stop forest thinning, and requiring the United States Forest Service to harvest  of lumber annually. Boebert has proposed legislation in the House anchoring the Bureau of Land Management's headquarters in Grand Junction, Colorado, which is in the 3rd district.

Foreign policy 
Boebert was one of 14 House Republicans, most of them members of the Freedom Caucus, to vote against a measure condemning the Myanmar coup d'état that passed overwhelmingly. She cited concern about a passage that urged social media platforms to prevent disinformation and violence, which she said was tantamount to making Big Tech the "arbiter of truth".

Boebert was one of 49 House Republicans to vote to repeal the authorization of military force against Iraq. She also voted against the bipartisan ALLIES Act, which would increase by 8,000 the number of special immigrant visas for Afghan allies of the U.S. military during its invasion of Afghanistan while also reducing some application requirements that caused long application backlogs; the bill passed the House, 407–16. In August 2021, after the Afghan government fell to the Taliban, Boebert tweeted, "the Taliban are the only people building back better", reusing Biden's "Build Back Better" campaign slogan. She also opposes intervention in the escalation of the war tensions between Russia and Ukraine that started in late 2021.

Boebert supports the construction of a Mexico–U.S. border wall and opposes amnesty for undocumented immigrants living in the US; she introduced two bills to that effect: one that would codify Trump's immigration policies into law and one that would annul executive orders and internal policies that enable or assist asylum and immigration procedures. Boebert said she intended to introduce a bill that would end financing of legal aid for immigrants. She criticized what she called Biden's failure to contain "a complete invasion at our southern border" and Democrats' preference for open borders that she said had enabled the Democratic electoral takeover of California.

Boebert has urged for even closer relations between Israel and the United States, saying that their foundings were divinely inspired and that they are the "two nations [in the world] that have been created to glorify God".

In 2023, Boebert was among 47 Republicans to vote in favor of H.Con.Res. 21, which directed President Joe Biden to remove U.S. troops from Syria within 180 days.

Health care 
During her primary campaign, Boebert argued for the repeal of the Affordable Care Act, also known as Obamacare, and advocated against the introduction of a single-payer healthcare system, saying it would harm small businesses like hers because of the prohibitive cost. After the election, she said she was undecided about whether it was best to keep or repeal Obamacare, but wished that a more market-based system would be adopted. During her tenure in Congress, she was one of two representatives (the other was Marjorie Taylor Greene) to vote against the TRANSPLANT Act, which reauthorized the National Marrow Donor Program through 2026, citing concern over the addition of the program to the national debt as it had not received a Congressional Budget Office evaluation.

COVID-19 policies 
Boebert opposes mitigation policies seeking to reduce COVID-19's spread. She has called the vaccine mandates unconstitutional and in particular opposed them for the military. She compared the federal government's COVID-19 vaccination efforts to "Biden [deploying] his Needle Nazis", and accused Anthony Fauci, who told people to overcome their political opposition and get the COVID-19 vaccine, of bullying. Boebert also alleged that there was a deliberate effort to introduce immigrants who would substitute the unvaccinated people. In June 2021, Boebert advised her constituents in Mesa County, who were experiencing an uptick of Delta variant cases at the time, that the "easiest way to make the Delta variant go away is to turn off CNN [and] vote Republican", but has since deleted the tweet amid public criticism. She has also compared the virus to communism.

Boebert is a vocal opponent of face mask wearing and argues that masks should be optional. She falsely claimed that during the two months that followed the end of the Texas mask mandate, the state did not record any COVID-19-related deaths. She introduced a bill that would ban all mask mandates on federal property and during travel in interstate commerce, attracting no support. Boebert was one of the people who voiced support for the Freedom Convoy 2022, a Canadian trucker protest seeking to repeal all COVID-19 vaccination mandates and COVID-19 restrictions. Boebert received a $500 fine for violating the mask mandate on Congress's premises.

In late February 2021, Boebert and a dozen other Republican House members skipped votes and enlisted others to vote for them, citing the ongoing COVID-19 pandemic, while actually attending the Conservative Political Action Conference, which was held at the same time as their absences. In response, the Campaign for Accountability, an ethics watchdog group, filed a complaint with the House Committee on Ethics and requested an investigation into Boebert and the other lawmakers.

Fentanyl 
In June 2022, Boebert introduced a bill that would classify the opioid fentanyl as a weapon of mass destruction. A Congressional Research Service report released in March stated that "formally designating fentanyl as [a weapon of mass destruction] may not be necessary for additional executive branch action" but that Congress could consider legislation to "address 'perceived shortcomings'."

LGBT rights 
Boebert opposes the Equality Act, saying it promotes "supremacy of gays" and says transgender women take scholarships and sports opportunities away from non-trans women. She opposes same-sex marriage, writing on her campaign website that she is against "efforts to redefine marriage as anything other than the union of one man and one woman". She introduced a bill to ban federal funding of research and publications into transgender health care for minors, asserting that they are being "sexualized and used for horrific sexual ‘research'" when being administered puberty blockers. In 2022, she cosponsored two bills widely seen as anti-LGBT legislation. The first, introduced by Marjorie Taylor Greene, would criminalize providing sex reassignment surgery and other forms of transgender health care to minors; the second was the Stop the Sexualization of Children Act, introduced by Mike Johnson, which would prohibit federally-funded institutions from promoting or instructing on LGBT issues or sexual orientation and is widely seen as a national version of Florida Parental Rights in Education Act.

Abortion and Planned Parenthood 
Boebert opposes comprehensive sex education, abortion and federal funding of Planned Parenthood.

Separation of church and state 
Boebert promotes the ideals of Christian nationalism. In June 2022, she told a church audience, "The church is supposed to direct the government. The government is not supposed to direct the church. That is not how our Founding Fathers intended it. And I am tired of this separation of church and state junk. It's not in the Constitution." Boebert's office asserted she was not expressing support of Christian theocracy. Experts said her statement is contrary to the Constitution's Establishment Clause.

Personal life 
Boebert, who became a born-again Christian in 2009, and her husband Jayson live in Silt, Colorado. They have four sons. Before Boebert and her husband opened Shooter's Grill, he worked in oil and gas fields.

Boebert says her first job at a McDonald's restaurant changed her views about whether government assistance is necessary. She has also said she became religious while attending a church in Glenwood Springs and volunteered at a local jail for seven years. Attendance logs at the Garfield County Sheriff’s office show that she volunteered at the jail nine times between May 2014 and November 2016.

In 2015, Boebert was detained at a music festival for shouting at a group of people arrested for underage drinking, yelling that the arrest was unconstitutional because they had not received Miranda warnings. Deputies reported she "encouraged people arrested for underage drinking to break free and repeatedly said she had 'friends at Fox News' who would report on her subsequent 'illegal arrest'". She was cited for misdemeanor disorderly conduct and twice failed to appear in court on the charge. The charge was later dismissed because the Mesa County district attorney's office believed there was no reasonable likelihood of conviction if the case went to trial.

In 2016, Boebert was cited for careless driving and operating an unsafe vehicle. On February 13, 2017, she was arrested and booked in Garfield County Jail for failure to appear in court on these charges. She pleaded guilty to the unsafe vehicle charge, and the careless driving and failure to appear charges were dismissed.

In her 2022 memoir, Boebert claimed that her husband never exposed himself in public, despite pleading guilty and serving jail time for an incident. Jayson Boebert was arrested in 2004 for exposing his penis to two young women at a Colorado bowling alley. He pleaded guilty to public indecency and lewd exposure, and was sentenced to four days in jail with a subsequent two years of probation.

In 2023, while speaking at a Moms for America event at the Conservative Political Action Conference (CPAC), she revealed that she will become a grandmother at age 36, as her eldest son, who is 17, and his girlfriend are expecting a child in April 2023. Boebert was also a teen mother, having given birth to her eldest son at age 19.

Electoral history

2020 election cycle

2022 election cycle

Explanatory notes

References

External links

 Representative Lauren Boebert official U.S. House website
 Official campaign website
 
 

|-

 

1986 births
Living people
21st-century American businesspeople
21st-century American businesswomen
21st-century American politicians
21st-century American women politicians
21st-century evangelicals
Activists from Colorado
American conspiracy theorists
American evangelicals
American Protestants
American gun rights activists
American nationalists
American women restaurateurs
American restaurateurs
Christians from Colorado
Far-right politicians in the United States
Female members of the United States House of Representatives
Gun politics in the United States
People from Altamonte Springs, Florida
People from Garfield County, Colorado
Protestants from Colorado
Republican Party members of the United States House of Representatives from Colorado
Right-wing politics in the United States
Right-wing populism in the United States
Women in Colorado politics